Sesriem is a small settlement in the Namib Desert, in the Hardap Region of Namibia, close to the southern end of the Naukluft Mountains.  It is especially known because the "Sesriem gate" is the main access point to the Namib-Naukluft National Park for visitors entering the park to visit the nearby tourist attraction of Sossusvlei.  As many "settlements" in the Namib, Sesriem is essentially a filling station with basic services such as public telephones and a couple of small kiosks where travellers can get general supplies such as food and water.  In the surroundings of Sesriem there are several accommodations, such as a few lodges (e.g., "Le Mirage Desert" and the "Sossusvlei Lodge") and 24 campsites.

By the Sesriem gate, hot air balloons depart in the early morning, providing scenic flights over the Sossusvlei dunes.

Sesriem Canyon
Sesriem is also known for Sesriem Canyon, about 4 km from Sesriem itself, which is the second most important tourist attraction in the area after Sossusvlei. The name Sesriem is Afrikaans and means "six rawhide thongs", given by settlers on the Dorsland Trek who had to join six such thongs in order for a bucket to reach the water. Sesriem Canyon is only two metres (6.5 feet) wide in some places, and has a portion that permanently contains water, which many animals use.

References

Resources
More information and photos of Sesriem Canyon

Populated places in the Hardap Region
Namib-Naukluft National Park